A hunting sword is a type of single-handed short sword that dates to the 12th century but was used during hunting parties among Europeans from the 17th to the 19th century. A hunting sword usually has a straight, single-edged, pointed blade typically no more than 36 inches long. This sword was used for finishing off game in lieu of using and wasting further shot. Adopted by many Europeans, and in past centuries sometimes worn by military officers as a badge of rank, hunting swords display great variety in design. Some hilts featured a thin knuckle-bow to protect the fingers. Others sported a serrated saw edge on the back of the blade. Still others had small matchlock pistols built into the hilt that originated in the early 18th century, with deep firing grooves cut into the fuller of the blade.

References

Modern European swords
Hunting equipment
Single-edged swords